Not for Publication may refer to:
 Not for Publication (1927 film), an American silent film

 Not for Publication (1984 film), a screwball comedy film

 Not for Publication (TV series), an American crime drama TV series